Yehor Ivanov (born 30 August 1991) is a Ukrainian football striker who plays for FC Poltava in the Ukrainian First League.

He made his debut for main Illichivets team as substitution in second half in a match against Tavriya Simferopol in Ukrainian Premier League on 26 September 2011.

References

External links 
 
 

Ukrainian footballers
FC Mariupol players
FC Illichivets-2 Mariupol players
FC Zirka Kropyvnytskyi players
FC Kremin Kremenchuk players
Ukrainian Premier League players
Association football forwards
1991 births
Living people
FC Poltava players
Footballers from Dnipro